The men's keirin competition at the 2019  UEC European Track Championships was held on 19 October 2019.

Results

First round
The first two riders in each heat qualified to the second round, all other riders advanced to the first round repechages.

Heat 1

Heat 2

Heat 3

Heat 4

First round repechage
The first rider in each heat qualified to the second round.

Heat 1

Heat 2

Heat 3

Heat 4

Second round
The first three riders in each heat qualified to final 1–6, all other riders advanced to final 7–12.

Heat 1

Heat 2

Finals

Small final

Final

References

Men's keirin
European Track Championships – Men's keirin